Gaitán also spelled "Gaytán" and "Gaitan"  (From Latin: Caietanus, Arabic: جيتني Geaitani, Ancient Greek: Καίετανος Kaietanos, Modern Greek: Γαϊτάνος/Γαϊτάνης  Gaitanos/Gaitanis meaning "who come from the cave/port" or who come from Gaeta, ancient Greek port of the Italian province of Lazio) is a common Spanish surname of Byzantine Greek-Latin Mediterranean origin. Notable people with the surname include:
Alberto Gaitán (born 1974), Panamanian Musical Producer, Songwriter & Singer Gaitanes
Fernando Gaitán (born 1960), Colombian TV series and telenovelas screenwriter and producer
Jorge Eliécer Gaitán (1898–1948), Colombian politician
Martín Gaitán (born 1978), Argentine rugby union footballer
Nicolás Gaitán (born 1988), Argentine football player
Ricardo Gaitán (born 1971), Panamanian Musical Producer, Songwriter & Singer Gaitanes
Walter Gaitán (born 1977), Argentine football player
Yanina Gaitán (born 1978), Argentine footballer
 Jef Gaitan  (born 1986), Philippine Actress

See also 
Gaytán

Spanish-language surnames